Jean Gilles Louis Georges Boisvert (February 15, 1933 – September 29, 2022) was a Canadian ice hockey player who played three games for the Detroit Red Wings in the National Hockey League during the 1959–60 season. The rest of his career, which lasted from 1953 to 1970, was spent in various minor leagues.

Career statistics

Regular season and playoffs

References

External links
 

1933 births
2022 deaths
French Quebecers
Baltimore Clippers players
Calgary Stampeders (WHL) players
Canadian ice hockey goaltenders
Chicoutimi Saguenéens (QSHL) players
Cleveland Barons (1937–1973) players
Detroit Red Wings players
Edmonton Flyers (WHL) players
Hershey Bears players
Ice hockey people from Quebec
Kitchener Canucks players
Montreal Royals (QSHL) players
Pittsburgh Hornets players
Rochester Americans players
St. Paul Rangers players
Spokane Comets players
Sportspeople from Trois-Rivières
Sudbury Wolves (EPHL) players
Vancouver Canucks (WHL) players